Caenorhabditis yunquensis is a species of nematodes in the genus Caenorhabditis. Prior to 2014, it was referred to as C. sp. 19. The single isolate of this species is from El Yunque, Puerto Rico.

This species groups with C. nouraguensis in the 'Japonica' group, the sister clade to the 'Elegans' group, in the 'Elegans' supergroup.

References

External links 

yunquensis
Fauna of Puerto Rico
Nematodes described in 2014